The Strėva is a river in Trakai and Kaunas district municipalities, Lithuania. In 1348, the Battle of Strėva between the Grand Duchy of Lithuania and the Teutonic Knights was fought on the frozen river. In 1962, the river was impounded to create the Elektrėnai Reservoir, the third-largest artificial lake in Lithuania. The Strėva flows through Elektrėnai, Žiežmariai, Semeliškės. According to a study in 2001, the Strėva was one of the cleanest rivers in the Neman basin in Lithuania.

Variant forms of spelling for Strėva or in other languages: Reka Strava, Strava, Streva, Strėva.

References

Rivers of Lithuania